Vạn Hạnh (938–1018) was a Vietnamese Thiền Buddhist monk. He was well known as the most important teacher, protector, and supporter of Lý Thái Tổ, the first emperor of the Lý dynasty.

See also
Vạn Hạnh Zen Temple

References

 
  

938 births
1018 deaths
10th-century Vietnamese people
Zen Buddhist monks
People from Bắc Ninh province
10th-century Vietnamese poets
Lý dynasty poets
Lý dynasty Buddhist monks